Chubar (also Romanized as Chūbar, Choobor, Chowbar, and Chuber; also known as Chobar) is a village in Chubar Rural District, Ahmadsargurab District, Shaft County, Gilan Province, Iran. At the 2006 census, its population was 1,248, in 335 families.

References 

Populated places in Shaft County